The Brătei is a right tributary of the river Ialomița in Romania. Its source is in the Bucegi Mountains. It flows into the Ialomița in Dobrești.

Tributaries
The following rivers are tributaries to the river Brătei (from source to mouth):

Left: Valea lui Marco, Văcăria, La Poduri, Valea lui Bădescu, Vâlcelul Lucăcilă, Valea lui Moise, Lucăcilă, Izvorul Zănoagei

Right: Duda Mare, Duda Mică, Valea Neagră, Mitarca, Pârâul Sec, Șutila

References

Rivers of Romania
Rivers of Dâmbovița County